Rajaji National Park is an Indian national park and tiger reserve that encompasses the Shivaliks, near the foothills of the Himalayas. It is spread over 820 km2 and includes three districts of Uttarakhand: Haridwar, Dehradun and Pauri Garhwal. In 1983, three wildlife sanctuaries in the area namely, Chilla, Motichur and Rajaji were merged into one.

Rajaji National Park has been named after C. Rajagopalachari (Rajaji), a prominent leader of the Freedom Struggle, the second and last Governor-General of independent India and one of the first recipients of India's highest civilian award Bharat Ratna (in 1954).

Tiger reserve status 

The Union government has given the nod to a proposal to grant the Rajaji National Park in Uttarakhand the status of a tiger reserve. It will be the second tiger reserve in the state after the Corbett Tiger Reserve and 48th Tiger Reserve of India. As per directions of the Tiger Conservative Authority of India, the Rajaji National Park will be core area of the Rajaji Tiger Reserve, while about 300 km2 of Shyampur range of the Haridwar forest division and parts of Kotdwar and Laldhang forest division, which function as a buffer zone, will also be included in the Tiger Project, augmented area to 1150 km2.

Final approval was accorded to Kudremukh (Karnataka) and Rajaji (Uttarakhand) for declaring as a tiger reserve on 15 April 2015. Rajaji became the second tiger reserve in Uttarakhand.

Flora 

Rajaji National Park of India is nestled between the Shivalik ranges and the Indo-Gangetic plains. Broadleaved deciduous forests, riverine vegetation, scrubland, grasslands and pine forests form the range of flora in this park. The under-wood is light and often absent, consisting of rohini Mallotus philippensis, amaltas Cassia fistula, shisham Dalbergia sissoo, Sal Shorea robusta, palash Butea monosperma, arjun Terminalia arjuna, khair Senegalia catechu, baans Dendrocalamus strictus, semul Bombax ceiba, sandan, chamaror Ehretia, amla Phyllanthus emblica, kachnar Bauhienia variegata, ber Ziziphus mauritiana, chilla Casearia, bel Aegle marmelos, etc.

Fauna 

Rajaji National Park is predominantly formed from dense green jungles, and this environment forms a habitat for a number of animals. The park is at the northwestern limit of distribution for both elephants and tigers in India. The park is most renowned for its elephants. The mountain goat, goral is another noteworthy resident. It is mainly confined to the precipitous pine-covered slopes. Besides pachyderms and the nimble goats, huge herds of chital are also found in the park, sometimes as many as 250 to a herd. Sambar, Muntjac, hog deer, nilgai, wild pigs and sloth bears also inhabit the park, though they may not always be visible to visitors. The rhesus macaque and the common langur are fairly common in the park. Tigers and leopards are the prime predators in Rajaji. The leopard cat, jungle cat, civet and yellow-throated marten are other carnivores. Mammals like the jackal and the Bengal fox scavenge in the park. The Himalayan black bear, though uncommon, can be sighted in the higher reaches of the park. Other wild animals found in the park include:

 Asian elephant
 Bengal tiger
 Indian Leopard
 Dhole
 Jungle cat
 Goral
 Indian hare
 Sloth bear
 Himalayan black bear
 King cobra
 Golden Jackal
 Barking deer
 Sambar deer
 Wild boar
 Rhesus macaque
 Indian langur
 Indian crested porcupine
 Monitor lizard
 Python

Over 315 species of birds are found in the park, whereas the wider region has over 500 species of birds, including both residents and migrants.  The most prominent avian species include pea fowl, vultures, woodpeckers, pheasants, kingfishers and barbets, supplemented by a number of migratory species during the winter months.  The park is also home to the great pied hornbill, pied kingfisher and the Fire-tailed sunbird. This area is the first staging ground after the migratory birds cross over the Himalayas into the Indian subcontinent.

The rivers which flow through the park harbour species of fish such as trout and mahseer.

Access
The park has several gates, and is accessible from many cities in Uttarakhand e.g. Dehradun, Kotdwar, Haridwar and Rishikesh. Saharanpur, which is linked by train to other parts of India, is another popular point to reach the Mohand area of the park in nearly an hour by road.

Incidents

Rajaji National Park was in the news in April 2010 when a forest fire which started on the fringes of the park, spread out over a large area and threatened the Chandi Devi Temple.
There are also many leopards that are becoming man eaters leading to many man-animal conflict situations. Elephants require a very large area and they may wander into populated areas. Unfortunately, Rajaji is just outside the Indian city of Haridwar and there are many wild animals wandering in the city.

References

National parks in Uttarakhand
Memorials to C. Rajagopalachari
Pauri Garhwal district
Haridwar district
Protected areas established in 1983
1983 establishments in Uttar Pradesh